Kahana is a village near Pind Dadan Khan in the District of Jhelum, Punjab Pakistan. The famous family of Kahana is the Awan family.
There is no hospital or post office.

Demographics
Kahana is a village of about 1000 population. Kahana is about 218 meters above sea level and about 175 kilometers away from Islamabad. There are two middle schools for boys and  girls. The majority of people have agricultural occupations and a few are government employees. The unemployment rate is about 10% and poverty rate is 2%.

Populated places in Jhelum District